Lewisburg is a historic railroad freight station located at Lewisburg, Union County, Pennsylvania.  It was originally constructed by the Philadelphia and Reading Railroad in 1884. It is a 1 1/2-story, brick and frame building in an eclectic Late Victorian style.  The roof consists of a hipped form at the north end and jerkin head gable at the south.  It features wide overhanging eaves, exposed rafters, and freight platform.  It was abandoned by Conrail in the 1970s, then restored and adapted for office use in 1986.

The freight building was listed on the National Register of Historic Places in 1992 as the Reading Railroad Freight Station. It is located in the Lewisburg Historic District.

References

Railway buildings and structures on the National Register of Historic Places in Pennsylvania
Railway freight houses on the National Register of Historic Places
Transportation buildings and structures in Union County, Pennsylvania
Historic district contributing properties in Pennsylvania
National Register of Historic Places in Union County, Pennsylvania